Eilean Dubh means 'Black Island' in Scottish Gaelic. Several islands in Scotland are called Eilean Dubh, including:

Eilean Dubh, Balnakeil Bay, an island in Balnakeil Bay, near Durness in Sutherland
Eilean Dubh, Kyles of Bute, an island in the Kyles of Bute
Eilean Dubh, Loch Craignish, an island in Loch Craignish, south of Oban in Argyll
Eilean Dubh, Sound of Jura, an island in the Sound of Jura
Eilean Dubh, Summer Isles, an island in the Summer Isles group
Eilean Dubh, two separate islets neighbouring Erraid, Inner Hebrides
Eilean Dubh a small fresh water island in Loch Shiel
Eilean Dubh, an islet connected to Eilean Mòr, Loch Dunvegan at low tide
Eilean Dubh a' Chumhainn Mhòir, an island in Loch Tarbert, Jura
Eilean Dubh Mòr an island in the Firth of Lorne
Eilean Dubh Beag an island in the Firth of Lorne
Eilean Dubh Beag an islet north of Eilean Dubh in Loch Dunvegan
Eilean Dubh Mòr, a freshwater islet in Loch Sgadabhagh, North Uist
Dubh Eilean, a tidal islet west of Oronsay

See also
Black Island (disambiguation)
Eilean Dubh (disambiguation)
List of Inner Hebrides
List of Outer Hebrides
List of islands of Scotland
An t-Eilean Dubh, the Gaelic name for the Black Isle area in Ross and Cromarty

Scottish Island set index articles